Royal Order of Saint Ferdinand may refer to:

 Royal Military Order of Saint Ferdinand, commonly called Laureate Cross of Saint Ferdinand, Spain's highest military award for gallantry
 Royal Order of Saint Ferdinand and of Merit, an order of knighthood of the Kingdom of the Two Sicilies